The 2021–22 Delaware Fightin' Blue Hens women's basketball team represented the University of Delaware during the 2021–22 NCAA Division I women's basketball season. The Fightin' Blue Hens, led by fifth year head coach Natasha Adair, played their home games at the Bob Carpenter Center and were members of the Colonial Athletic Association (CAA). 

They finished the season 24–8, 15–3 in CAA play to finish second place. As the second seed in the CAA tournament the defeated William & Mary in the Quarterfinals, Towson in the Semifinals, and Drexel in the Final to win their third championship in team history.  They received an automatic bid to the NCAA tournament and were the thirteen seed in the Spokane Regional. They were defeated in the First Round by Maryland to end their season.

Previous season 
The Blue Hens finished the regular season 19–3, 16–2 in CAA play to win their first conference regular season championship since 2013. They lost in the finals of the CAA women's tournament to Drexel. The team was given an automatic qualifier to the 2021 Women's National Invitation Tournament where they won the Charlotte Regional Championship by defeating Villanova. The team lost to eventual WNIT Champion Rice in the semifinals, marking Delaware's furthest advance in the tournament. The team received Top 25 votes in the Coaches Poll of the 2020–21 NCAA Division I women's basketball rankings in weeks 8, 9, 16, and 17.

Roster

Schedule
Source:

|-
!colspan=6 style=| Non-conference regular season

|-
!colspan=6 style=| CAA Regular Season

|-
!colspan=6 style=| CAA Women's Tournament

|-
!colspan=6 style=| NCAA tournament

Rankings

The Coaches Poll did not release a Week 2 poll and the AP Poll did not release a poll after the NCAA Tournament.

References

 
Delaware Fightin' Blue Hens women's basketball seasons
Delaware
Delaware, basketball women
Delaware, basketball women
Delaware